Acer shenkanense is an Asian species of maple. It has been found only in China (Gansu, Hubei, Shaanxi, Sichuan)

Acer shenkanense is a small deciduous tree up to 10 meters tall with brown or gray bark. Leaves are non-compound, up to 10 cm wide and 12 cm across, thin and papery, with 3 or 5 lobes.

References

External links
line drawing for Flora of China drawing 3 at lower right

shenkanense
Plants described in 1981
Flora of China